Alexandre Audebert (born 4 August 1977) is a rugby union player for Clermont in the Top 14. He made his debut for France on 28 May 2000 against Romania in Bucharest.

External links
RBS 6 Nations profile

References

French rugby union players
ASM Clermont Auvergne players
Rugby union flankers
France international rugby union players
1977 births
Living people